The Guggenmos Bullet is a series of German high-wing, single-place, hang gliders that were designed by World Hang Gliding Champion Josef Guggenmos and produced by his company Drachenbau Josef Guggenmos.

Design and development
The Bullet gliders were designed as competition gliders. There are versions with kingposts and "topless" versions, each in two sizes. All four designs were certified to DHV Class 2-3.

Variants
Bullet Cut
The price was €3957 in 2003.
Bullet Cut S
The price was €3857 in 2003.
Bullet RCS
The price was €4802 in 2003.
Bullet RCS-M
The price was €4802 in 2003.

Specifications (Bullet Cut)

References

Hang gliders